Terese Coe is an American writer, translator, and dramatist.

Background 

Terese Coe was born in New York, NY. She received a B.A. in English with a minor in comparative literature from the City College of New York and an M.A. in dramatic literature from the University of Utah. Her poems and translations have appeared in US journals including 32 Poems, Able Muse, Alaska Quarterly Review, American Arts Quarterly, The Cincinnati Review, The Connecticut Review, The Huffington Post, Measure, New American Writing, Ploughshares, Poetry, Smartish Pace, The Shakespeare Newsletter, Stone Canoe, Tar River Poetry, and The Threepenny Review; in the UK in Agenda, Anon, Interlude, Interpreter’s House, Leviathan Quarterly, New Walk, Orbis, Poetry Review, the Times Literary Supplement, and Warwick Review; and in Ireland, in Crannog, Cyphers, and The Stinging Fly. The EBSCO research database lists numerous poems and translations by Coe.

Coe's poem "More" was among those chosen by Poetry Review Guest Editor George Szirtes to be heli-dropped across London as part of the 2012 London Olympics' Poetry Parnassus' Rain of Poems event.

Terese Coe's first collection of poems, The Everyday Uncommon, was published in 2005 by Wordtech. 
Her second collection, Shot Silk, was published in 2015 by White Violet Press. Her work appears in anthologies such as Anthology One (from the Alsop Review), Grace Notes: Poetry from the Pages of First Things, Irresistible Sonnets, and Phoenix Rising from the Ashes (Canada)

Coe has worked as editor and writer for publications including The New York Free Press and Changes (NY, 1969); English teacher and director of poetry workshops in Kathmandu, Nepal; director of children’s poetry workshops at the Sun Valley (ID) Center for the Arts; and as editorial consultant for numerous financial publications at investment banks in Manhattan. She is currently an adjunct professor of English writing and literature in NY.

Awards and Scholarships 

 Willis Barnstone Translation Prize, Finalist, 2009 and 2004 for her translations of Pierre de Ronsard’s “Goodbye to the Green” (from the French) and Rainer Maria Rilke’s “End of Autumn” (from the German), respectively. Evansville, Ohio.
 Giorno Poetry Systems: Two grants for poetry, 1999 and 2000; John Giorno, New York, NY.
 Helen Schaible Sonnet Award 2008: First Prize for poem, “Book of Changes.”
 The Nimrod/Hardman Prize 2005: Semifinalist for poem, “Letter to Anton Chekhov.” From Nimrod International Journal, Oklahoma.
 Nuyorican Poets Ball, 1992: First Prize in satire, Host Bob Holman.
 Orbis: “Lullaby” (translation from Rainer Maria Rilke) and “Saint John’s Bread” received the Orbis Readers’ Poll Honorable Mention for poems in Orbis 131, Spring 2005.
 Poet's Prize: Shot Silk was shortlisted for the 2017 Poet's Prize. 
 Smartish Pace: nomination for a Pushcart Prize for her Ronsard translation, “Beset by War”; Dec. 1, 2006, MD.
 Triplopia: nominations for Pushcart Prize for “Minetta” in 2003; for “Spanish Dancer” in 2004, translated from the German of Rainer Maria Rilke.
 The West Chester Poetry Conference, West Chester University, PA: scholarships to attend in various years, including 2003 and 2005.
 Wordtech Communications: The Everyday Uncommon was a finalist in the Word Press Prize in 2004 and was published in 2005.

Critical reception 

Hayden Carruth wrote about The Everyday Uncommon: “It’s clear to me that she knows what she’s doing, she’s doing what she wants to do, and she does it well.” The book has also received critical praise from Rhina Espaillat, R. S. Gwynn, David Mason, and Deborah Warren, among others.

Terese Coe's work was discussed in depth by editors of the Cincinnati Review in 2012, and has been reviewed and discussed by Paul Hoover and other critics. Reviews of Shot Silk are by A.M. Juster, in Angle,, Gregory Dowling, in Semicerchio,  and D.A. Prince, in New Walk, reprinted at Eratosphere.

Works

Sample poems and translations 

 Agenda: Translations
 American Arts Quarterly: “Tompkins Square”
 Candelabrum: "Ponderosa Pine" and "Only the Road"
 Christian Century: Rilke’s “The Angels”
 Cincinnati Review and Soapbox Media: “For I Will Consider”
 E-Verse Radio: translation of Heinrich Heine’s “Where?” (first appeared in Agenda, UK) and “Actors”
 Huffington Post: “In Spate”
 The Hypertexts: varying poems and translations
 Kin: “Mollusks” and “Taking the Fall” (first appeared in Poetry Nottingham, UK)
 Lilt: “And This Is What We Have” (post 9-11), “Behind These Eyes” and “It Wasn’t”
 New American Writing: Translations
 Poetry Foundation: Translation of Pierre de Ronsard’s “Epitaph for François Rabelais”
 Soundzine: “Hide or Pay Heed,” “I Died for War, and “I Am” (inc. sound files)
 Stone Canoe: “Sponge”
 Umbrella: “Approaching Salt Lake City from the East”
 Unsplendid: Translation of Pierre de Ronsard’s “Adieu Cruel Girl”
 Verse Daily: “In the Lee of the Disaster”

Collections 
Why You Can't Go Home Again, Kelsay Books (October, 2018), 
Shot Silk, Kelsay Books (February, 2015), 
The Everyday Uncommon, Wordtech (January, 2005),

Essays 

 Umbrella: Carmine Street Metrics: An Introduction, 2012.

References 

Living people
American women poets
Year of birth missing (living people)
21st-century American women